2010 government formation may refer to:

 2010–2011 Belgian government formation
 2010–2012 Bosnia and Herzegovina government formation
 2010 Iraqi government formation
 2010 Ukrainian government formation
 2010 United Kingdom government formation